Leonard Toni Marian Naidin (born 15 September 1979) is a Romanian former football player who played as an attacking midfielder for teams such as  FC Bihor Oradea, Politehnica Timișoara, Dinamo București, Politehnica Iaşi or Neftchi Baku, among others.

Although born in Timișoara, Naidin first played for FC Bihor Oradea during the 1995/1996 season in the Liga II. He moved to Poli Timișoara in 1998, only to return at FC Bihor three years later. He made his debut in the first league with the team in 2003 and transferred the very same season at to-be champions Dinamo Bucharest. Naidin came back home in January 2005, as new sponsors took control of Poli Timișoara.

In February 2007 he transferred to Politehnica Iași, joining his former coach Ionuţ Popa.

External links
 
 
 
 

1979 births
Living people
Sportspeople from Timișoara
Romanian footballers
Association football midfielders
FC Bihor Oradea players
FC Politehnica Timișoara players
FC Dinamo București players
FC Politehnica Iași (1945) players
CS Mioveni players
Romanian expatriate footballers
Expatriate footballers in Azerbaijan
Liga I players
Azerbaijan Premier League players
Neftçi PFK players